Shenkar may refer to:

 L. Shankar or Shenkar (born 1950), Indian violinist, singer, and composer
 Shenkar College of Engineering and Design, a college in Ramat-Gan, Israel

he:שנקר